"Progressive Internationalism: A Democratic National Security Strategy" is a proposed national security policy report for the U.S. Democratic Party, published by the Progressive Policy Institute in October 2003.

Its authors, all Democrats, are:
Ronald D. Asmus
James R. Blaker
Lael Brainard
Kurt Campbell
Greg Craig
Larry Diamond
Michèle Flournoy
Philip Gordon
Edward Gresser
Bob Kerrey
Will Marshall
Michael McFaul
Steven J. Nider
Kenneth Pollack
Jeremy Rosner

The document is often cited as an exposé of liberal hawk thinking. It declares support for the American-led overthrow of the Taliban regime in Afghanistan and for the 2003 war in Iraq, but criticizes the administration of George W. Bush for weakening America's standing in the world and for relying too much on military force to solve problems.

External links
Progressive Internationalism: A Democratic National Security Strategy

Democratic Party (United States)
Internationalism